Aksyonov (masculine) or Aksyonova (feminine), alternatively spelled Aksenov/Aksenova, is a Russian surname. Variants of this surname include Avksentyev/Avksentyeva (/), Aksanov/Aksanova (/), Aksentyev/Aksentyeva (/), Aksentsev/Aksentseva (/), Aksentsov/Aksentsov (/), Aksyutin/Aksyutina (/), Aksyanov/Aksyanova (/), and Oksyonov/Oksyonova (also spelled Oksenov/Oksenova) (/).

All these surnames derive from various forms of the Christian male first name Avksenty (from Greek auxanō, meaning to increase). The following people share this surname:
Aleksandr Aksyonov (disambiguation), several people
Aleksey Aksyonov (born 1987), Russian sprint athlete
Alisa Aksyonova (Алиса Аксёнова) (born 1931), Russian museum director
Alyona Aksyonova, Uzbekistani shooter participating in the 2004 Summer Olympics
Anastasia Aksenova (Anastasiya Aksyonova) (born 1990), Russian swimmer
Antonina Aksyonova, adopted child of Yevgenia Ginzburg, Soviet dissident writer
Grigoriy Aksenov (Grigory Aksyonov), Kazakhstani participants in the second heat of the 2005 Asian Athletics Championships – Men's 800 metres
Anastasia Aksenova (Aksyonova) (born 1990), Russian swimmer
Boris Aksenov (Boris Aksyonov), bass guitarist, one of the original members of Zemlyane, a Soviet/Russian rock band
Igor Aksyonov (born 1977), Russian association football player
Irina Aksyonova (born 1962), Soviet Olympic swimmer
Lyubov Aksenova (Lyubov Aksyonova), Soviet participant in Heat 3 of the 1971 European Athletics Championships – Women's 400 metres
Lyubov Aksyonova, name of Russian philologist Lyubov Sova after 1979
Lyudmila Aksyonova (born 1947), Soviet athlete
Maksim Aksyonov (disambiguation), several people
Nikolay Aksyonov (born 1970), Russian Olympic rower
Nikolay Aksenov, Soviet participant in the Continental Final at the 1970 Individual Speedway World Championship
Ogdo Aksyonova (1936–1995), Dolgan poet, founder of the Dolgan written literature
Oleksandr Aksyonov (born 1994), Ukrainian association football player
Pavel Aksyonov, second husband of Yevgenia Ginzburg, Soviet dissident writer and father of writer Vasily Aksyonov
Pyotr Aksyonov, founder of the Court of Auditors, a historical predecessor of the modern Accounts Chamber of Russia
Sergei Aksenov (Sergey Aksyonov) (born 1971), Russian politician
Sergey Aksyonov (born 1972), Prime Minister of Crimea
Vasily Aksyonov (1932-2009), Soviet/Russian writer
Vladimir Aksyonov (born 1935), Soviet cosmonaut and double Hero of the Soviet Union
Yana Aksenova, one of the theremin performers invited to perform songs included into the Teen Age Message, a series of interstellar radio transmissions
Yekaterina Aksenova, maintainer of the Russian Gov-Gov webblog, a part of Government 2.0
Yuri Aksenov (Yury Aksyonov) (born 1973), Kazakhstani association football player

See also
Aksenovo, several rural localities in Russia
Aksenovka, several rural localities in Russia

References

Notes

Sources
И. М. Ганжина (I. M. Ganzhina). "Словарь современных русских фамилий" (Dictionary of Modern Russian Last Names). Москва, 2001. 



Russian-language surnames